Alexander Wai Ping-kong is a former Deputy President and Provost of the Hong Kong Polytechnic University, who served from 1 March 2020. He had served the Hong Kong Polytechnic University for over 20 years since 1996. He assumed the position of President and Vice-Chancellor of the Hong Kong Baptist University on 1 February 2021.

In late July 2021, at his first press conference since taking up his position at Baptist University and slightly over a year after the enactment of the Hong Kong National Security Law,  Wai said that the university had no plans to limit research on areas such as Hong Kong independence and human rights abuses in Xinjiang; management would not advocate their colleagues breaking the law, however. At the same time, Baptist University together with at least two other public universities in Hong Kong introduced mandatory undergraduate education on national security in the form of seminars and talks.

Campus visit during the November 2019 siege
In November 2019, during the Siege of the Hong Kong Polytechnic University which marked an escalation of the 2019–2020 Hong Kong protests, Wai, who was vice-president of the university at the time, visited the campus together with council chairman Lam Tai-fai and fellow vice-president Ben Young. As they were reaching the communal building, they were stopped by a student who complained about the management figures having failed in their duties by not helping the students. When Wai was told to help clean the kitchen whose cleanliness he had criticized in response, he agreed and cleaned the kitchen for around 30 minutes.

References

Year of birth missing (living people)
Alumni of the University of Hong Kong
Living people
Academic staff of Hong Kong Polytechnic University
Members of the Election Committee of Hong Kong, 2021–2026